Crookneck squash, also known as yellow squash, is a cultivar of Cucurbita pepo, the species that also includes some pumpkins and most other summer squashes. The plants are bushy and do not spread like the plants of winter squash and pumpkin. Most often used as a summer squash, it is characterized by its yellow skin (which may be smooth or bumpy) and sweet yellow flesh, as well as its distinctive curved stem-end or "crooked neck". It should not be confused with crookneck cultivars of Cucurbita moschata, such as the winter squash 'Golden Cushaw', or the vining summer squash 'Tromboncino'. Its name distinguishes it from another similar-looking variety of C. pepo, the straightneck squash, which is also usually yellow. There is one similar non-edible C. pepo variety: C. pepo var. ovifera.

Yellow crookneck squash are generally harvested immature, when they are less than two inches in diameter, since the skin toughens and the quality degrades as the squash reaches full maturity.

References

External links
 
 National Nutrient Database for Standard Reference

Squashes and pumpkins